The 1987 Tour de France was the 74th edition of Tour de France, one of cycling's Grand Tours. The Tour began in West Berlin with a prologue individual time trial on 1 July and Stage 13 occurred on 13 July with a mountain stage from Bayonne. The race finished on the Champs-Élysées in Paris on 26 July.

Stage 13
13 July 1987 — Bayonne to Pau,

Stage 14
14 July 1987 — Pau to Luz Ardiden,

Stage 15
15 July 1987 — Tarbes to Blagnac,

Stage 16
16 July 1987 — Blagnac to Millau,

Stage 17
17 July 1987 — Millau to Avignon,

Stage 18
19 July 1987 — Carpentras to Mont Ventoux,  (individual time trial)

Stage 19
20 July 1987 — Valréas to Villard-de-Lans,

Stage 20
21 July 1987 — Villard-de-Lans to Alpe d'Huez,

Stage 21
22 July 1987 — Le Bourg-d'Oisans to La Plagne,

Stage 22
23 July 1987 — La Plagne to Morzine,

Stage 23
24 July 1987 — Saint-Julien-en-Genevois to Dijon,

Stage 24
25 July 1987 — Dijon to Dijon,  (individual time trial)

Stage 25
26 July 1987 — Créteil to Paris Champs-Élysées,

References

1987 Tour de France
Tour de France stages